The Lo Nuestro Award for Grupero Artist of the Year  is an award presented annually by American network Univision. It was first awarded in 2001 and has been given annually since. The accolade was established to recognize the most talented performers of Latin music. The nominees and winners were originally selected by a voting poll conducted among program directors of Spanish-language radio stations in the United States and also based on chart performance on Billboard Latin music charts, with the results being tabulated and certified by the accounting firm Deloitte. At the present time, the winners are selected by the audience through an online survey. The trophy awarded is shaped in the form of a treble clef.

The award was first presented to Mexican singer Joan Sebastian in 2001. Mexican group Los Temerarios hold the most wins and most nominations with 6 out of eight nominations. Fellow Mexican group Bronco - El Gigante de América is the most nominated act without a win, with six unsuccessful nominations. Mexican singer, Alicia Villarreal is the only female act to have won the accolade.

Winners and nominees
Listed below are the winners of the award for each year, as well as the other nominees for the majority of the years awarded.

See also
 Latin Grammy Award for Best Grupero Album

References

Grupero artist
Grupera musicians
Awards established in 2001